Kavali is a town in Nellore district of Andhra Pradesh of India. It also serves as headquarters of Kavali mandal and Kavali revenue division.It is one of the few cities from Andhra Pradesh which were selected for Atal Mission for Rejuvenation and Urban Transformation (AMRUT) Scheme.

Transportation Facilities

• HighWay =  NH-16

• Sea Port =    Ramaypatnam (Upcoming Port)

• Air Port  =    Near At Dagadarti ( Upcoming Port )

Etymology 
In the local language, Kavali means patrol. The name arises from the fact that in 1515, the king of Udayagiri, Harihara Rayulu stationed his army at this town.

History

Geography 

The town is at a distance of  8 km from the Bay of Bengal.

Demographics 
The total population is  males,  females and  children (in the age group of 0–6 years). The average literacy rate stands at 81.09% with  literates, significantly higher than the national average of 73.00%.

Governance 

Civic administration

Kavali Municipal Council is the seat of l0ocal government which administers Kavali town.

Politics

Economy

Education 

As per the school information report for the academic year 2018–19, the town has a total of 57 schools. These include 34 private, 2 ZPHS  and 21 municipal schools.

VSU PG Study centre and JB college is located in Kavali.3 engineering colleges are present in the town. post graduation college which provide various UG and PG courses.

Climate

Transport

Roadways 

National Highway 16, a part of Golden Quadrilateral highway network, bypasses the town. National Highway 167BG which starts at National Highway 167B near Seetharamapuram village in Nellore district ends at kavali.

Railways 

Kavali railway station is located on the Howrah–Chennai main line. It is classified as a B–category station in the Vijayawada railway division of South Central Railway zone. The Andhra Pradesh State Road Transport Corporation operates bus services from Kavali bus station. The nearest planned upcoming sea port is Ramayapatnam port which is at a distance of 20 km from the town.

Air 
The nearest airport is under construction at Dagadarthi which is 25 km from the town.

See also 
 List of towns in Andhra Pradesh
 List of municipalities in Andhra Pradesh

References

External links 

Towns in Nellore district